Mathias Müller (born 3 April 1992) is a German field hockey player who plays as a defender for Bundesliga side Hamburger Polo Club and the Germany national team.

Club career
Müller started playing hockey at the age of four at UHC Hamburg. He made his debut for the senior team when he was 18 years old. He then played for Rot-Weiss Köln from 2013 until 2018. In 2018 he returned to Hamburg to play for Hamburger Polo Club.

International career
Müller made his debut for the German national team in 2014. He represented his country at the 2016 Summer Olympics, where he won the bronze medal. On 6 December he was named in the squad for the 2023 Men's FIH Hockey World Cup. He played in all seven matches as Germany won the tournament.

References

External links
 
 
 
 
 

1992 births
Living people
Field hockey players from Hamburg
German male field hockey players
Male field hockey defenders
Field hockey players at the 2016 Summer Olympics
2018 Men's Hockey World Cup players
Olympic field hockey players of Germany
Olympic bronze medalists for Germany
Olympic medalists in field hockey
Medalists at the 2016 Summer Olympics
Rot-Weiss Köln players
Uhlenhorster HC players
2023 Men's FIH Hockey World Cup players
21st-century German people
Men's Feldhockey Bundesliga players